Kodiak Coil Tubing was an oilfield service company headquartered in Brooks, Alberta. It operated a fleet of ten coil tubing units from operational bases in Brooks, Medicine Hat and Three Hills, all in Southern Alberta. On March 31, 2006, it was acquired by Avenir for C$22.25 million.

References

Companies based in Alberta
Defunct oil and gas companies of Canada
Non-renewable resource companies disestablished in 2006